Peter Keller may refer to:

 Peter Keller (footballer) (born 1961), German former footballer
 Peter Keller (murder suspect) (?–2012), American survivalist and suspected murderer
 Peter G. Keller (1894–1972), American stamp dealer
 Peter Keller (tennis) (born 1944), Australian tennis player